Vince Guaraldi and the Lost Cues from the Charlie Brown Television Specials, Volume 2 is a compilation album by Vince Guaraldi released by D & D Records (Guaraldi's label) in 2008. The album is a follow-up to the 2007 release, Vince Guaraldi and the Lost Cues from the Charlie Brown Television Specials, which consisted of previously unreleased music cues featured on several Peanuts television specials produced in the 1970s.

Background
In the mid-2000s, recording studio master tapes for seven 1970s-era Peanuts television specials scored by Vince Guaraldi were discovered by his son, Dave Guaraldi. Dave selected a handful of the better individual songs to compile two volumes of unreleased music cues.

Dave Guaraldi worked to restore the master tapes again with sound engineer Michael Graves at his Atlanta, Georgia-based Osiris Studio.

The songs chosen for this volume were featured in the following Peanuts television specials:
You're Not Elected, Charlie Brown (1972)
A Charlie Brown Thanksgiving (1973)
It's a Mystery, Charlie Brown (1974)
It's the Easter Beagle, Charlie Brown (1974)
Be My Valentine, Charlie Brown (1975)

Reception and notability
Sound Insights author Doug Payne noted that the release of Vince Guaraldi and the Lost Cues from the Charlie Brown Television Specials was notable due to the fact that almost none of Guaraldi's Peanuts soundtrack work was made available for public consumption. Despite scoring 16 Peanuts television specials and one feature film, only two official soundtracks were released during Guaraldi's lifetime: Jazz Impressions of A Boy Named Charlie Brown (an unaired television documentary) and A Charlie Brown Christmas. Vince Guaraldi and the Lost Cues from the Charlie Brown Television Specials did much to fill a significant gap in this respect.

Chris Holmes of the nostalgia-themed website grayflannelsuit.net commented that "although some songs are quite brief, they paint a good picture of Guaraldi’s music near the end of his life; whimsical, funky, and always impeccably performed."

T. Ballard Lesemann of the Charleston City Paper called "Little Birdie" the "best Thanksgiving theme," commenting the "anti-worry/positive sentiment and snuffy singing style somehow matches the vibe of the season. Guaraldi sings lead, just barely in front of a great-sounding brass section and some funky electric piano."

Track listing
Numerous errors were made with respect to incorrect/misspelled titles, running times and song order. Proper titles and song lengths appear with incorrectly titled tracks in parenthesis.

The song "Bus Me," originally featured in There's No Time for Love, Charlie Brown, does not appear on the album despite being listed as Track 3. "There's Been a Change" (Track 6) is an alternate version than that featured in Be My Valentine, Charlie Brown. "Nobody Else" (Track 15) is a CD/iTunes bonus track.

Personnel
All songs recorded at Wally Heider Studios, San Francisco, California (except "Nobody Else").

You're Not Elected, Charlie Brown – Vince Guaraldi Quintet
Recorded on August 22, 1972
Vince Guaraldi – acoustic piano, electric keyboards, guitars, vocals
Seward McCain – electric bass
Tom Harrell – trumpet
Pat O'Hara – flute
Glenn Cronkhite – drums

A Charlie Brown Thanksgiving – Vince Guaraldi Quintet
Recorded on July 17-18, August 6 and October 1, 1973
Vince Guaraldi – acoustic piano, electric keyboards, vocals, guitars
Seward McCain – electric bass
Tom Harrell – trumpet
Chuck Bennett – trombone
Mike Clark – drums

It's a Mystery, Charlie Brown – Vince Guaraldi Quartet
Recorded on January 5, 11, 23 and 30, 1974
Vince Guaraldi – acoustic piano, electric keyboards, guitars
Seward McCain – electric bass
Tom Harrell – trumpet
Eliot Zigmund – drums (January 11)
Mike Clark – drums (all other dates)

It's the Easter Beagle, Charlie Brown – Vince Guaraldi Quartet
Recorded on February 12, 20, 26 and March 14, 1974
Vince Guaraldi – acoustic piano, electric keyboards, guitars
Seward McCain – electric bass
Tom Harrell – trumpet
Eliot Zigmund – drums

Be My Valentine, Charlie Brown – Vince Guaraldi Trio
Recorded on December 30, 1974; January 3, 1975
Vince Guaraldi – acoustic piano, electric keyboards, guitars
Seward McCain – electric bass
Vince Lateano – drums

References

External links
 

2008 soundtrack albums
2008 compilation albums
Albums arranged by Vince Guaraldi
Vince Guaraldi albums
Vince Guaraldi soundtracks
Cool jazz soundtracks
Mainstream jazz soundtracks
Peanuts music
Television animation soundtracks